Military chocolate is a food component of the Swiss Armed Forces. Swiss chocolate in general is a very popular food.

History

The military chocolate had the official designation "emergency rations" (Notportion or ration de secours or razione di soccorso or raziun da reserva) in the Swiss army. It was black dark chocolate packed in two white cardboard boxes, which were covered with a transparent plastic film. They were about the size of a cigarette box. The two cardboard boxes were connected but could easily be separated by a perforation. This military chocolate was produced by several companies, e.g. from Villars-Maitre-Chocolatier or Chocolat Stella.
For decades the military chocolate has been part of the basic rations for Swiss soldiers. In addition to the Military biscuit, it is popular for schoolchildren who receive them from soldiers. The military chocolate thus achieved a certain cult status.

In the course of time, a chocolate board of 50 g was introduced into a red paper package and a milk chocolate bar of 50 g in red plastic packaging. This was more popular than the emergency portions, but not available in the same quantity.
This led to the rumor that this chocolate was only for officers. This gave rise to the unofficial designation "officer chocolate".
The "Offiziersschokolade" has now replaced the emergency ration. The emergency rations are no longer part of the official military rations. As of May 1, 2005, Stella's earlier black chocolate was taken out of service. The manufacturer in Ticino, however, continues to produce them in the original recipe and sells them to civilian customers.
Current military chocolate also contains Rice Krispies or corn flakes. In addition to the chocolate bars, the military chocolate is available for promotion purposes in the form of a napolitain of 5 g. The Swiss army obtains their military chocolate from various manufacturers, which are UTZ Certified, among others from the Chocolat Stella or the Chocolat Frey.

Protected brand
Since 2013 the protection of the brand "Swiss Army"  is to be enforced on behalf of Parliament. In April 2016 the Handelsgericht Bern prohibited a chocolate manufacturer from using the brand name "Swiss Army" without a corresponding license.

See also

 Emergency rations
 Military biscuit
 Military chocolate (United States)

References

External links
 Judgment about the protected designation
 History of military chocolate

History of food and drink
Military equipment of Switzerland
Military food
Sports nutrition
Swiss cuisine
Swiss chocolate